Tiyeglow (Maay: Tiyeeglow), sometimes also called Tieglow, is a town in the southwestern Bakool region of Somalia. It has a population of around 117,000 inhabitants. The broader Tiyeglow District has a total population of 117,053 residents.

Notes

References
Tiyeglow

Populated places in Bakool